Alem Kola (also Romanized as ‘Ālem Kolā, ‘Ālam Kalā, ‘Alam Kolā, and ‘Ālem Kalā) is a village in Lafur Rural District, North Savadkuh County, Mazandaran Province, Iran. At the 2006 census, its population was 503, in 155 families.

References 

Populated places in Savadkuh County